Eric Burdon Declares "War" is the first of two original albums by American band Eric Burdon and War, released on MGM Records in April 1970. It peaked at number 18 on record charts in the USA, number 50 in the UK, and number 7 in Australia. The back cover includes this declaration: "We the People, have declared War against the People, for the right to love each other". The album received a gold record award.

In 1981, LA Records (producer Jerry Goldstein's own label) reissued the album under the title Spill the Wine.  It has also been reissued under its original title on CD by Avenue / Rhino Records.

Cover art
The cover, credited to The Visual Thing (with Burdon credited for the concept), depicts two disembodied but joined arms, one white and one black, both giving a three finger salute, similar to the peace sign which uses two fingers.  The three fingers may represent the letter "w" in the word "war".  This salute was also used on the cover of a future album, War.  The use of a background sun also appears as a recurring theme on both front and back covers of The Black-Man's Burdon and the innersleeve of Deliver the Word.

Track listing
All tracks written by War (Papa Dee Allen, Harold Brown, Eric Burdon, B.B. Dickerson, Lonnie Jordan, Charles Miller, Lee Oskar, Howard E. Scott) except where noted.  Note: Memphis Slim composed music under the name of Peter Chatman which was actually his father's name; on the original album the composer credit is misprinted as "P. Chapman".

Side one
 "The Vision of Rassan" - 7:40
"Dedication"" – 2:33
"Roll on Kirk" – 5:07
"Tobacco Road" - 14:24
"Tobacco Road" (John D. Loudermilk) – 3:47
"I Have a Dream" – 6:39
"Tobacco Road" (Loudermilk) – 3:58

Side two
 "Spill the Wine" – 4:38
 "Blues for Memphis Slim" - 13:08
"Birth" – 1:31
"Mother Earth"  (Peter Chatman) – 2:46
"Mr. Charlie" – 3:05
"Danish Pastry" – 3:18
"Mother Earth" (Chatman) – 2:28
 "You're No Stranger" (Thomas C Carter) – 1:55

Personnel
Eric Burdon – lead vocals
Lee Oskar – harmonica
Charles Miller – tenor saxophone, flute
Howard Scott – guitar, backing vocals
Lonnie Jordan – organ, piano
Bee Bee Dickerson – bass, backing vocals
Harold Brown – drums
Dee Allen – conga, percussion

Production
Jerry Goldstein – producer
Chris Huston – engineer

References

1970 debut albums
War (American band) albums
Eric Burdon albums
MGM Records albums
Rhino Records albums
Albums recorded at Wally Heider Studios
Albums produced by Jerry Goldstein (producer)